Neocollyris resplendens is a species of ground beetle in the genus Neocollyris in the subfamily Carabinae. It was described by Horn in 1902.

References

Resplendens, Neocollyris
Beetles described in 1902